Neobisium sylvaticum is a species of pseudoscorpions in the Neobisiidae family. It is found throughout Europe with the exception of the Benelux union, the Nordic countries, and the British Isles. The type locality is Frauenholz in Regensburg, Bavaria, Germany.

Description
They are primarily black with four pairs of legs, and dark red claws.

Neobisiidae
Animals described in 1835
Arachnids of Europe